Shane Hurley (born 1997) is an Irish hurler who plays for Cork Senior Championship club St Finbarr's. He usually lines out as a goalkeeper.

Honours

University College Cork
Fitzgibbon Cup: 2019, 2020

St. Finbarr's
Cork Premier Senior Hurling Championship: 2022

Cork
All-Ireland Intermediate Hurling Championship: 2018
Munster Under-21 Hurling Championship: 2018

References

External links
2018 Cork Under-21 Hurling team player profiles at the Cork GAA website

1997 births
Living people
St Finbarr's hurlers
Cork inter-county hurlers